Broadway Playbill was a 1960 LP album by American vocal group The Hi-Lo's containing songs from three Broadway musicals: Gypsy The Sound of Music, and Fiorello!. The album was released by Columbia Records, as catalog number CL-1416 (in monaural) and CS-8213 (in stereo).

Broadway Playbill was combined with the Hi-Lo's 1957 album Now Hear This into a compact disc released by Collectables Records on October 17, 2000.

Track listing

External links
Description of the album
Description of the CD including this album and Now Hear This

The Hi-Lo's albums
1960 albums
Columbia Records albums
Covers albums